Orekhovo is a rural locality (a selo) in Valuysky District, Belgorod Oblast, Russia. The population was 99 as of 2010. There are 4 streets.

Geography 
Orekhovo is located 15 km west of Valuyki (the district's administrative centre) by road. Sitnyanka is the nearest rural locality.

References 

Rural localities in Valuysky District